The 1987 American Racing Series Championship consisted of 10 races. Didier Theys won three races on his way to the championship.

Calendar

Race summaries

Phoenix race
Held April 12 at Phoenix International Raceway. Didier Theys won the pole.

Top Five Results
1- Jeff Andretti
5- Didier Theys
2- Juan Manuel Fangio II
20- Mike Groff
4- George Metsos

Milwaukee race
Held May 31 at The Milwaukee Mile. Didier Theys won the pole.

Top Five Results
5- Didier Theys
7- Dave Simpson
20- Mike Groff
50- Tommy Byrne
4- George Metsos

Meadowlands race
Held June 28 at the Meadowlands Sports Complex. Didier Theys won the pole.

Top Five Results
5- Didier Theys
1- Jeff Andretti
11- Rich Rutherford
7- Dave Simpson
81- Lee Perkinson Jr.

Cleveland race
Held July 5 at Burke Lakefront Airport. Didier Theys won the pole.

Top Five Results
5- Didier Theys
50- Tommy Byrne
71- Steve Millen
1- Jeff Andretti
11- Rich Rutherford

Toronto race
Held July 19 at Exhibition Place. Tommy Byrne won the pole.

Top Five Results
50- Tommy Byrne
20- Mike Groff
71- Steve Millen
23- Albert Naon Jr.
81- Lee Perkinson Jr.

Pocono race
Held August 16 at Pocono Raceway. Tommy Byrne won the pole.

Top Five Results
50- Tommy Byrne
1- Jeff Andretti
8- Mike Hooper
71- Steve Millen
5- Didier Theys

Mid-Ohio race
Held September 6 at The Mid-Ohio Sports Car Course. Tommy Byrne won the pole.

Top Five Results
2- Juan Manuel Fangio II
71- Steve Millen
20- Mike Groff
50- Tommy Byrne
1- Jeff Andretti

Nazareth race
Held September 20 at Nazareth Speedway. Didier Theys won the pole.

Top Five Results
20- Mike Groff
5- Didier Theys
1- Jeff Andretti
23- Albert Naon Jr.
11- Rich Rutherford

Laguna Seca race
Held October 11 at Mazda Raceway Laguna Seca. Dave Simpson won the pole.

Top Five Results
7- Dave Simpson
5- Didier Theys
50- Tommy Byrne
71- Steve Millen
20- Mike Groff

Miami race
Held November 1 at Tamiami Park. Dave Simpson won the pole.

Top Five Results
1- Jeff Andretti
7- Dave Simpson
2- Juan Manuel Fangio II
23- Albert Naon Jr.
16- George Metsos

Final points standings

Driver

For every race the points were awarded: 20 points to the winner, 16 for runner-up, 14 for third place, 12 for fourth place, 10 for fifth place, 8 for sixth place, 6 seventh place, winding down to 1 points for 12th place. Additional points were awarded to the pole winner (1 point) and to the driver leading the most laps (1 point).

Note:

Race 1, 3, 5, 7 and 8 not all points were awarded (not enough competitors).

Complete Overview

R10=retired, but classified NS=did not start

References

Indy Lights seasons
American